Allef is a given name. Notable people with the name include:

 Allef (footballer, born 1993), Brazilian football defender
 Allef (footballer, born 1994), Brazilian football forward

See also
 Allaf
 

Masculine given names